Belgium competed at the 2018 Winter Olympics in Pyeongchang, South Korea, from 9 to 25 February 2018, with 22 competitors in 9 sports. They won one silver medal, the country's first Winter Olympic medal since 1998, ranking 25th in the medal table.

Medalists

Competitors 
The following is the list of number of competitors participating in the Belgian delegation per sport.

Alpine skiing 

Belgium qualified two male and two female alpine skiers, Kai Alaerts, Marjolein Decroix, Sam Maes and Kim Vanreusel.

Biathlon 

Belgium qualified two male biathletes, signifying the nation's Olympic debut in the sport.

Bobsleigh 

Belgium qualified two teams for the women's bobsleigh competition.

* – Denotes the driver of each sled

Cross-country skiing 

Belgium qualified one male skier, Thierry Langer, signifying the nation's Olympic debut in the sport.

Distance

Figure skating 

Belgium qualified one female figure skater, based on its placement at the 2017 World Figure Skating Championships in Helsinki, Finland.  They additionally qualified one male figure skater through the 2017 CS Nebelhorn Trophy. The team was announced on December 15, 2017.

Short track speed skating 

Belgium qualified two skaters for men's 1500 m event for the Olympics during the four World Cup events in November 2017. The team was officially announced on December 26, 2017 by the Belgian Olympic Committee.

Skeleton 

Belgium qualified one female skeleton athlete. This will mark the country's Winter Olympics debut in the sport.

Snowboarding 

Belgium qualified three male snowboarders, Sebbe De Buck, Seppe Smits and Stef Vandeweyer.

Freestyle

Speed skating

Belgium earned the following quotas at the conclusion of the four World Cup's used for qualification. The team was officially announced on December 26, 2017 by the Belgian Olympic Committee. Belgium later earned an additional quota for Mathias Vosté after the approval of the Olympic Athletes from Russia team allowed for reallocations.

Individual

Mass start

References

Nations at the 2018 Winter Olympics
2018
Winter Olympics